Arzachel may refer to:
 Arzachel, an Arabic astronomer
 Arzachel (crater), a lunar crater
 Uriel (band)